La Recouvrance is a replica gaff rigged schooner, named in honour of Recouvrance, one of the districts of Brest.

History
The idea for La Recouvrance was originally conceived in 1990.

She was modeled on the plans for Iris, which was designed by the French naval engineer Hubert in 1817.  Originally, there had been five vessels built from Iris design, and these ships were employed in the early nineteenth century as courier vessels for the Navy. Eventually, their role was expanded to include surveillance and protection of merchant shipping off the African and West Indian coasts.

The proposal for a replica vessel was taken up by several public and private interests in Brest, which formed Goelette la Recouvrance organisation to oversee the project. Construction on the ship began in 1991, and employed both volunteer and paid labour. The partially completed La Recouvrance was launched at the Brest '92 maritime festival, and her rig was completed a year later.

In 1996, management of the vessel was transferred to SOPAB Brest.

Career
La Recouvrance sails regularly from Brest, offering day sails for up to 25 passengers and overnight sails for up to 12.

She occasionally attends maritime festivals, and has visited many European nations.

Gallery

See also
 
 List of schooners

References

Recouvrance official site (in French)
La Recouvrance official site (in English)
SOPAB official site
Chantier du Guip, the shipyard where La Recouvrance was built

Schooners
Individual sailing vessels
Ships of France
Brest, France
1993 ships
Replica ships
Ships built in France